John Bremner may refer to:

John Bremner (1833–1887), Scottish explorer of Alaska
John B. Bremner (1920–1987), Australian-American journalist and professor 
John M. Bremner (1922–2007), Scottish-American soil scientist and professor at Iowa State University